The Ica Province is the largest of five provinces of the Ica Region in Peru. The capital of the province is the city of Ica.

Huacachina is a small town, oasis and resort in this region.

Political division 

The Ica Province is divided into fourteen districts, each of which is headed by a mayor (alcalde):

Districts 
 Ica
 La Tinguiña
 Los Aquijes
 Ocucaje
 Pachacute
 Parcona
 Pueblo Nuevo
 Salas
 San José de los Molinos
 San Juan Bautista
 Santiago
 Subtanjalla
 Tate
 Yauca del Rosario

Villages and towns 
 

Comatrana

See also 

 Administrative divisions of Peru

References

External links 

 Official web site of the Ica Province

Provinces of the Ica Region